Dalibor is a 1956 Czech  film rendering of the opera of the same name by Bedřich Smetana. Directed by Václav Krška, the film was entered into the 1956 Cannes Film Festival.

Cast
 Václav Bednář as King Vladislav
 Karel Fiala as Dalibor
 Věra Heroldová as Milada
 Přemysl Kočí as Budivoj
 Josef Celerin as Beneš
 Josef Rousar as Vítek
 Jana Rybářová as Jitka
 Milo Červinka as Zdenek
 Luděk Munzar

References

External links
 
 DVD info

1956 films
1956 drama films
1950s musical drama films
Czech musical drama films
Czechoslovak musical drama films
1950s Czech-language films
Films directed by Václav Krška
Films set in the 1490s
Films based on operas
Opera films
1950s Czech films